"I Was on a Boat That Day" is a song recorded by American country music band Old Dominion. It was released on May 21, 2021 as the lead single from their fourth studio album Time, Tequila & Therapy. The song was written by each member of Old Dominion, Shane McAnally, Josh Osborne, and produced by McAnally and Old Dominion.

Composition
I Was on a Boat That Day is in the key of B major.

Content
"I Was on a Boat That Day" is a summer party anthem with "joyful ad-libs, raucous instrumentation, and [...] classically Old Dominion rhythms and rhymes".

Lead vocalist Matthew Ramsey said the idea started around six or seven years ago, he told KFDI: “We were kicking it around for a long time. We’d bring it up and shoot it down I don’t know how many times we decided not to write this song.”

In a press release, Ramsey mentioned: "When you listen to 'I Was On a Boat That Day' you are hearing us in the full joy of making music together, from the moment I counted the band off we were smiling from beginning to end. The tequila was flowing, the laughter was loud, and we knew in that moment we were creating something that would bring people as much joy as it was bringing us."

Music video
The music video, directed by Mason Allen, was uploaded on May 21, 2021. Clips show partygoers dancing and smiling, and the band members performing the song on a boat.

Charts

Weekly charts

Year-end charts

Certifications

References

2021 singles
2021 songs
Old Dominion (band) songs
Songs written by Josh Osborne
Songs written by Shane McAnally
Songs written by Matthew Ramsey
Song recordings produced by Shane McAnally
RCA Records Nashville singles
Songs written by Brad Tursi
Songs written by Trevor Rosen
Songs about boats